Harry W. Hill (politician) (1886 - 1954), Arizona state senator
 Harry W. Hill (admiral) (1890 – 1971), admiral in the U. S. Navy